Made in Chelsea: NYC, the spin-off series of Made in Chelsea, a British structured-reality television programme, began airing on 10 August 2014 on E4. The series concluded on 14 September 2014 after 6 episodes. It was announced on 18 March 2014 that the cast of Made in Chelsea would be travelling to New York City to film a special series of the show. Despite the series featuring all of the Chelsea cast, there were notable absences from Andy Jordan, Georgia "Toff" Toffolo, and Sophie Hermann.

A number of American cast members were introduced during this series including Alik Alfus, Billie Carroll, and Jules Hamilton. It also included a brief return of original cast member Gabriella Ellis, who was originally featured in the show from series one to four. Alik was the only one who remained as a cast member after this series.

This series was also the last to feature original cast member Cheska Hull as well as Riley Uggla. The spin-off series included the love blossoming between Alik and Louise, the competition between Spencer and Stevie for Billie before Stevie’s ex-girlfriend Stephanie arrives, Alex attempting to make amends with people then leaving with more enemies than friends, and the revelation that Lucy and Proudlock have been hooking up. It was revealed that this would be a stand-alone series which would not be promoted as the eighth series. The eighth series in fact followed in October 2014.

Cast

Episodes

{| class="wikitable plainrowheaders" style="width:100%; background:#fff;"
|- style="color:black"
! style="background: #FFFFCC;"| SeriesNo.
! style="background: #FFFFCC;"| EpisodeNo.
! style="background: #FFFFCC;"| Title
! style="background: #FFFFCC;"| Original airdate
! style="background: #FFFFCC;"| Duration
! style="background: #FFFFCC;"| UK viewers

|}

Ratings

External links

References

2014 British television seasons
British television spin-offs
NYC
Television shows set in New York City